Antimony trichloride is the chemical compound with the formula SbCl3. It is a soft colorless solid with a pungent odor and was known to alchemists as butter of antimony.

Preparation
Antimony trichloride is prepared by reaction of chlorine with antimony, antimony tribromide, antimony trioxide, or antimony trisulfide. It also may be made by treating antimony trioxide with concentrated hydrochloric acid.

Reactions

SbCl3 is readily hydrolysed and samples of SbCl3 must be protected from moisture. With a limited amount of water it forms antimony oxychloride releasing hydrogen chloride:
SbCl3 + H2O → SbOCl + 2 HCl

SbCl3 readily forms complexes with halides, but the stoichiometries are not a good guide to the composition; for example, the  contains a chain anion with distorted SbIII octahedra. Similarly the salt  contains a polymeric anion of composition  with distorted octahedral SbIII.

With nitrogen donor ligands, L, complexes with a stereochemically active lone-pair are formed, for example Ψ-trigonal bipyramidal LSbCl3 and Ψ-octahedral .

Structure
In the gas phase SbCl3 is pyramidal with a Cl-Sb-Cl angle of 97.2° and a bond length of 233 pm. In SbCl3 each Sb has three Cl atoms at 234 pm showing the persistence of the molecular SbCl3 unit, however there are a further five neighboring Cl atoms, two at 346 pm, one at 361 pm, and two at 374 pm. These eight atoms can be considered as forming a bicapped trigonal prism. These distances can be contrasted with BiCl3 which has three near neighbors at 250 pm, with two at 324 pm, and three at a mean of 336 pm. The point to note here is that the all eight close neighbours of Bi are closer than the eight closest neighbours of Sb, demonstrating the tendency for Bi to adopt higher coordination numbers.

Uses
SbCl3 is a reagent for detecting vitamin A and related carotenoids in the Carr-Price test. The antimony trichloride reacts with the carotenoid to form a blue complex that can be measured by colorimetry.

Antimony trichloride has also been used as an adulterant to enhance the louche effect in absinthe. It has been used in the past to dissolve and remove horn stubs from calves without having to cut them off.

It is also used as a catalyst for polymerization, hydrocracking, and chlorination reactions; as a mordant; and in the production of other antimony salts. Its solution is used as an analytical reagent for chloral, aromatics, and vitamin A.
It has a very potential use as a Lewis acid catalyst in synthetic organic transformation.

A solution of antimony trichloride in liquid hydrogen sulfide is a good conductor, though the applications of such are limited by the very low temperature or high pressure required for hydrogen sulfide to be liquid.

References in popular culture
In episode 12 of the third season of the popular British program All Creatures Great and Small (adapted from chapter six of the book All Things Wise and Wonderful), several calves died following an episode of nonspecific gastroenteritis, the cause of which was later determined to be ingestion of antimony trichloride present in a solution used to dissolve their horn stubs.

References 

Chlorides
Metal halides
Antimony(III) compounds
Alchemical substances